Colombia at the 1956 Summer Olympics in Melbourne, Australia was the nationa's fourth appearance at the 13 edition of the Summer Olympic Games after having missed the twelfth edition of the Summer Games. An all-male national team of 26 athletes competed in 23 events in 6 sports.

Athletics

Men
Track & road events

Cycling

Sprint
Leon Mejia — 12th place

Time trial
Octavio Echeverry — 1:14.8 (→ 15th place)

Team pursuit
Héctor MonsalveHonorio RúaOctavio EcheverryRamón Hoyos — 11th place

Team road race
Ramón HoyosPablo HurtadoJaime Villegas — 92 points (→ 8th place)

Individual road race
Ramón Hoyos — 5:23:40 (→ 13th place)
Pablo Hurtado — 5:34:49 (→ 39th place)
Jaime Villegas — 5:34:49 (→ 40th place)
Jorge Luque — did not finish (→ no ranking)

Fencing

Six fencers represented Colombia in 1956.

Men's foil
 Pablo Uribe
 Gabriel Blando
 Emilio Echeverry

Men's team foil
 Pablo Uribe, Emilio Echeverry, Gabriel Blando, Emiliano Camargo

Men's épée
 Emilio Echeverry
 Alfredo Yanguas
 Emiliano Camargo

Men's team épée
 Alfredo Yanguas, Emiliano Camargo, Emilio Echeverry, Pablo Uribe

Men's sabre
 Emilio Echeverry
 Alfredo Yanguas
 José del Carmen

Shooting

Three shooters represented Colombia in 1956.

25 m pistol
 Enrique Hanabergh

50 m pistol
 Enrique Hanabergh

50 m rifle, three positions
 Guillermo Padilla

Trap
 William Pietersz

Swimming

Weightlifting

See also
Sports in Colombia

References

External links
Official Olympic Reports

Nations at the 1956 Summer Olympics
1956
Oly